Naakulabye, also Nakulabye, is a neighborhood within the city of Kampala, the capital and largest city in Uganda.

Location
Naakulabye is located in Lubaga Division, in northwestern Kampala. It is bordered by Makerere Kikoni to the north, Makerere University Main Campus to the northeast and east, Old Kampala to the southeast, Namirembe Hill to the south, Lusaze to the west and Kasubi to the northwest. The coordinates of Naakulabye are:0°19'30.0"N, 32°33'36.0"E (Latitude:0.3250; Longitude:32.5600).

Overview
Naakulabye is a working-class neighborhood, centered on the confluence of the Kampala–Hoima Road Southbound, Kampala–Hoima Road Northbound, Makerere Hill Road and Balintuma Road. There is a busy farmers market, numerous shops, bars and restaurants. Near the main roads, there are decent buildings. including several high-rise student hostels. As one ventures deeper into the neighborhood, the environment degrades into one of Kampala's biggest slums. Crime is high in the area, consistent with similarly congested, low-income areas of Kampala.

Points of interest
The following points of interest lie within or near Naakulabye:
 Naakulabye Central Market
 The Kampala-Hoima Highway - the highway passes through the middle of the neighborhood in a north to south direction
 A branch of Equity Bank (Uganda)
 passes kasubi tomb

 Exodus Christian Church - A place of worship affiliated with the Pentecostal Movement
 Total Petrol station

See also

References

External links
  Crime In Naakulabye Fueled By Unemployment And Drug Use

Neighborhoods of Kampala
Lubaga Division
Buganda